SMA or S.M.A. may refer to:

Places
 American Samoa, ITU letter code
 Santa Maria Airport (Azores) (IATA code)

People
 Sergeant Major of the Army, U.S.
 Sima (Chinese surname),  or Sma
 Joshua Falk, known as SM"A

Finance
 Separately managed account, types of investment account
 Special memorandum account, used regarding US Regulation T

Organisations
 Scouts Musulmans Algériens, the Algerian Muslim Scouts
 Sharjah Museums Authority
 SMA Engines, a diesel aircraft engine manufacturer
 SMA Solar Technology
 Society of African Missions, a Catholic missionary organization
 Society of Makeup Artists, post-nominal letters

Education
 Saint Mary's Academy, Dominica
 Sekolah Menengah Atas, Indonesian for "senior secondary school"
 San Marcos Baptist Academy, Texas, US
 Sarasota Military Academy, Florida, US
 Science and Mathematics Academy, a program at Aberdeen High School, Maryland, US
 Former Staunton Military Academy, Charles Town, Virginia, US

Science, engineering and technology
 Shape-memory alloy, that returns to its shape when heated
 Signal magnitude area, a statistical measure of magnitude
 Stone mastic asphalt, a type of road surface
 Styrene maleic anhydride, a synthetic polymer
 Submillimeter Array, radio telescopes in Mauna Kea, Hawaii, US

Computing and electronics
 SMA* (Simplified Memory-bounded Algorithm), a shortest path algorithm
 SMA connector (SubMiniature version A), a coaxial RF connector
 SMA 905 or F-SMA I, SMA 906 or F-SMA II, an optical fiber connector
 SMA or DO-214AC, a variant of the DO-214 diode package
 Surface-mount assembly, in electronics

Medicine and biology
 Standard methods agar or plate count agar
 SMA, several medical abbreviations
 SMA 12, SMA 20 and SMAC, previous names of Comprehensive metabolic panel blood tests
 α-SMA or  ACTA2, an actin protein
 Spinal muscular atrophy, a severe neuromuscular disorder
 Spinal muscular atrophies, a heterogeneous group of rare disorders
 Superior mesenteric artery
 Supplementary motor area, of the primate brain

Mathematics
 Simple moving average, in statistics

Music
 Seoul Music Awards
 "Sma", a 1999 song from the Point No. 1 album by  band Chevelle

Other uses
 Simulated milk adapted, an infant formula
SMA, Nestlé brand of baby milk
 Southern Sami language (ISO 639-2 language code)

See also